Albert II, the Degenerate (de: Albrecht II der Entartete) (1240 – 20 November 1314) was a Margrave of Meissen, Landgrave of Thuringia and Count Palatine of Saxony. He was a member of the House of Wettin.

He was the eldest son of Henry III, Margrave of Meissen by his first wife, Constantia of Austria.

Life
In 1265 Margrave Henry III granted the Landgraviate of Thuringia and the Palatinate to Albert and the Margraviate of Landsberg in the Osterland to his younger brother Dietrich. Henry III kept for himself the Margraviates of Meissen and Lusatia as a formal power over his sons.

In June 1255 Albert married Margaret of Sicily, the daughter of Emperor Frederick II, who was also King of Sicily, and Isabella of England. Margaret, also known as Margaret of Schwaben was a sister of Henry Otto, also known as Carlotto. As a dowry the Pleissnerland was pledged to the House of Wettin. Albert and Margaret had five children:

 Henry, Lord of Pleissnerland (b. 21 March 1256 - d. 25 January/23 July? 1282), inherited the Pleissnerland in 1274; he married Hedwig, daughter of Henry III the White.
Frederick (b. 1257 - d. Wartburg, 16 November 1323), Margrave of Meissen.
Dietrich, called Diezmann (b. 1260 - murdered Leipzig, 10 December 1307), Margrave of Lusatia.
Margaret (b. 1262 - d. young, aft. 17 April 1273).
Agnes (b. 1264 - d. September 1332), married before 21 July 1282 to Henry I, Duke of Brunswick-Grubenhagen.

After what was at first a happy rule and marriage, Albert turned away from Margaret and began a passionate love affair with Kunigunde of Eisenberg. She bore him two children: a daughter, Elisabeth in 1269, and a son, Albert ("Apitz") in 1270.

When she discovered the adultery and the illegitimate births, Margaret left Wartburg on 24 June 1270 and went to Frankfurt am Main where she died on 8 August of the same year. The two younger sons, Frederick and Diezmann were looked after by their uncle, Theodoric of Landsberg. Henry, the oldest, disappeared in Silesia in 1282.

Albert married Kunigunde in 1274 and legitimised their children. When Albert intended to leave the Landgraviate of Thuringia to Apitz and compensate his sons from his first marriage with only the Osterland (which included the inheritance from their mother) and the County Palatine of Saxony, they began a war against their father. Frederick was captured by his father and was locked up in Wartburg castle; however, he escaped one year later and continued the war against his father together with Diezmann. During this time, in 1284, their uncle Theodoric of Landsberg died, and four years later, in 1288, Henry the Illustrious, Albert's father, also died. These deaths heightened the family disputes.

At the death of his father, Albert became Margrave of Meissen, while his nephew Frederick Tuta - son of Theodoric of Landsberg - inherited the Margraviate of Lusatia, which was sold off by Albert's son Diezmann in 1303. Shortly after, Frederick captured his father Albert in battle. By the Treaty of Rochlitz (1 January 1289), Albert obtained his freedom after the renunciation of large parts of his lands. He retained Meissen for himself, but later sold it to Frederick Tuta. When, after his death (1291) his cousins Frederick and Diezmann arbitrarily took possession of his lands, Albert - suffering financial difficulties - was compelled to sell Thuringia in 1293 to the German King Adolf of Nassau; in the contract, it was stipulated that the king could take possession of the lands after Albert's death. In the sale, Albert included Meissen and Osterland as his fiefs, despite the fact they were in the hands of his sons. Thanks to this, Adolf's successor Albert I of Habsburg was able to take possession of these lands, claiming that the contract of sale was legitimate and lawful.

Kunigunde of Eisenberg died on 31 October 1286. Four years later, on 1 October 1290, Albert married thirdly Elisabeth of Orlamünde, heiress of Nordhalben and widow of Hartmann XI of Lobdeburg-Arnshaugk. The same year, Apitz, Albert's son by Kunigunde, was formally legitimized by the Emperor and created Herr of Tenneberg. He wished to make Apitz his successor in Thuringia, but the plan was resisted by his two elder sons.

On 11 April 1291 Apitz's younger full-sister, Elisabeth, married Henry III of Frankenstein; the marriage was short-lived and childless. Elisabeth died on 28 September 1293. Three years later (9 October 1296), Apitz married a sister of his brother-in-law Henry III, apparently also called Elisabeth. This marriage, like his sister's, was childless.

Four years later (24 August 1300) Albert's eldest surviving son, Frederick, married Elisabeth of Lobdeburg-Arnshaugk, daughter of his stepmother; this caused the final reconciliation between father and son. Five years later (27 June 1305) Apitz of Tenneberg died, aged thirty-five. The death of his favorite son was a terrible blow to Albert. He never recovered from the loss.

Two years later, in 1307, Albert finally resigned the Landgraviate of Thuringia and the County Palatine of Saxony to his son Frederick in exchange for an annuity. He died seven years later in Erfurt, aged seventy-four.

Ancestors

See also
List of Margraves of Meißen
Wettin (dynasty)

References

Margraves of Meissen
Landgraves of Thuringia
Rulers of Thuringia
1240 births
1314 deaths
House of Wettin
People from Meissen
Christians of the Prussian Crusade